The Years of the Locust is a surviving 1916 American drama silent film directed by George Melford and written by Beatrice DeMille, Leighton Osmun, Albert Payson Terhune and Harvey F. Thew. The film stars Fannie Ward, Walter Long, Jack Dean, Martin Best and Charles Ogle. The film was released on November 16, 1916, by Paramount Pictures.

Plot
Though in love with Dirck Mead, Lorraine is forced to marry wealthy Aaron Roth to save her family from financial ruin. The husband, however, turns out to be a scoundrel, a swindler who, chased by the police, to escape the law, throws himself from a steamer. Roth is given up for dead. Mead, meanwhile, has become a diamond tycoon. After marrying Lorraine, he takes her with him to South Africa. Roth, who is not dead, finds his wife and blackmails her, threatening to denounce her as bigamous. Lorraine decides to leave Mead, but when she discovers that Roth plans to steal a precious diamond her husband is escorting around town, she steps in, asking for help. In the ensuing turmoil, Roth is killed, also solving Lorraine's marital status problem.

Cast 
Fannie Ward as Lorraine Roth
Walter Long as Aaron Roth
Jack Dean as Dirck Mead
Martin Best as Williams, Roth's Secretary
Charles Ogle as McKenzie, Mead's Mine Manager

Preservation status
The film is preserved in the UCLA Film and Television Archive.

References

External links 
 

1916 films
1910s English-language films
Silent American drama films
1916 drama films
Paramount Pictures films
Films directed by George Melford
American black-and-white films
American silent feature films
1910s American films